McDonald's Pakistan is the Pakistani affiliate of the international fast food chain, McDonald's. Its first restaurant was established in Lahore, followed by a second restaurant a week later in Karachi, in September 1998.

McDonald's Pakistan currently operates 72 outlets across 24 major cities nationwide, serving millions of customers. Its franchise locations include Karachi, Lahore, Faisalabad, Islamabad, Rawalpindi, Gujranwala, Peshawar, Multan, Hyderabad, Quetta, Sargodha, Bahawalpur, Sialkot, Sukkur, Sheikhupura, Rahim Yar Khan, Dera Ghazi Khan, Gujrat, Sahiwal, Abbottabad and Jhelum. The largest number of outlets is in Lahore, followed by Karachi and Islamabad-Rawalpindi.

Corporate history
In Pakistan, the franchise rights for McDonald's are owned by Siza Foods Pvt. Ltd., a subsidiary of the Karachi-based Lakson Group of Companies.

In December 2015, the fast food chain opened doors to its first restaurant in the northwestern city of Peshawar, with a seating capacity of 200. In April 2016, McDonald's opened its first restaurant in Quetta. 

In January 2018, McDonald's became a sponsor of the Peshawar Zalmi cricket team and announced a "Peshawar Zalmi Meal" which fans would be able to order at restaurants. Revenues generated from the special meals would be donated to the Peshawar Zalmi Foundation, and spent on uplifting the lives of underprivileged children.

In April 2019, McDonald's and Pakistan International Airlines (PIA) inked a memorandum of understanding providing special meals and offers for PIA passengers, which would be printed on their boarding passes and remain valid across all McDonald's outlets nationwide.

In September 2019, McDonald's and Chevron Pakistan announced a strategic partnership, wherein Chevron would satisfy the manufacturing requirements of lubricants and coolants for all of McDonald's Pakistan restaurants.

Products

According to chief executive Amin Lakhani, the options and standard of food at McDonald's Pakistan is at par with McDonald's internationally; consumers eat chicken, beef, fish, hamburger and cheeseburger products, however "we have a range that is slightly spicier because people want spicy food" in Pakistan. In 2011, McDonald's Pakistan received the Golden Arch Award for brand quality, hygiene standards and customer service.

Several of McDonald's former and current products have been influenced by local tastes, and customised to appeal to the Pakistani market. These include the Mutton Burger, first introduced in 2014 for a limited time. In 2017, McDonald's unveiled the Chicken Chapli Burger with a meat patty evidently influenced by the chapli kebab, which was received positively. In March 2019, the McDonald's Bun Kebab was introduced for the first time, a knock-off from the famous Pakistani sandwich and street food known by the same name. According to McDonald's marketing director Raza Ali, adding the Bun Kebab to the menu was an instinctive move considering its extreme popularity in "every nook and corner of Pakistan", and because "a significant proportion of our customers refrain from indulging in a bun kabab due to the unhygienic conditions they are usually made in" typically at dhabas and shops, despite being cheaper than the McDonald's version; thus providing the opportunity to capitalise on both taste and hygiene, something many consumers would be willing to pay a higher price for. Similarly, a McDonald's Lassi was introduced for a limited period to coincide with the fasting month of Ramadan, and was produced in partnership with Nestlé Pakistan.

Gallery

See also
KFC Pakistan
Pizza Hut Pakistan
List of the largest fast food restaurant chains
Pakistani Cuisine

References

Pakistani companies established in 1998
Food and drink companies based in Karachi
Fast-food chains of Pakistan
Lakson Group
Pakistan
Pakistani subsidiaries of foreign companies